From the North is the sixth album by Swedish hardcore punk band Raised Fist, released on January 19, 2015.

Track listing

Charts

Credits
Raised Fist
 Alexander "Alle" Hagman – vocals
 Jimmy Tikkanen – guitar
 Daniel Holmberg – guitar
 Andreas "Josse" Johansson – bass
 Matte Modin – drums
 
Production
 Roberto Laghi – Producing, mixing
 Jakob Herrmann – Co-producing, engineering

References

2015 albums
Raised Fist albums
Epitaph Records albums